The 2016 World Rugby Under 20 Trophy was the ninth annual international rugby union competition for Under 20 national teams, second-tier world championship.

The event was held in Harare, Zimbabwe and was organized by rugby's governing body, World Rugby.

Venue 
The championship was held in Harare.

Qualifying 
As the host nation, Zimbabwe qualified automatically, as did Samoa for being relegated from 2015 World Rugby Under 20 Championship. The remaining six countries competed through a qualification process in their regional competitions (Africa, Asia, North America, South America and Europe).

Qualifying teams 
A total of 8 teams played in the tournament.

Asia Rugby (1)
  
Rugby Africa (2)
  
  
Sudamérica Rugby (1)
 

Rugby Americas North (1)
  
Rugby Europe (1)
 
Oceania Rugby (2)

Teams

Pool Stage 
Venue: Harare Sports Club, Harare

Pool A 
{| class="wikitable" style="text-align: center;"
|-
!width="200"|Team
!width="25"|Pld
!width="25"|W
!width="25"|D
!width="25"|L
!width="35"|PF
!width="35"|PA
!width="35"|PD
!width="25"|TF
!width="25"|TA
!width="25"|Pts
|-
|align=left| 
| 3||3||0||0||142||54||+88||19||7||15
|-
|align=left| 
| 3||2||0||1||88||88||0||6||9||10
|-
|align=left| 
| 3||1||0||2||106||116||–10||16||15||7
|-
|align=left| 
| 3||0||0||3||68||146||–78||6||14||0
|}

Pool B 
{| class="wikitable" style="text-align: center;"
|-
!width="200"|Team
!width="25"|Pld
!width="25"|W
!width="25"|D
!width="25"|L
!width="35"|PF
!width="35"|PA
!width="35"|PD
!width="25"|TF
!width="25"|TA
!width="25"|Pts
|-
|align=left| 
| 3||3||0||0||104||46||+58||14||6||14
|-
|align=left| 
| 3||2||0||1||138||92||+50||18||13||10
|-
|align=left| 
| 3||1||0||2||92||76||+16||12||10||8
|-
|align=left| 
| 3||0||0||3||28||148||–118||4||19||0
|}

Finals

7th place play-off

5th place play-off

Bronze final

Final

References 

2016
2016 rugby union tournaments for national teams
2016 in Zimbabwean sport
International rugby union competitions hosted by Zimbabwe
Sport in Harare
2016 in youth sport
21st century in Harare